To Please a Lady is a 1950 American romance film produced and directed by Clarence Brown, and starring Clark Gable and Barbara Stanwyck. The climactic race scene was shot at the Indianapolis Motor Speedway.

Plot
Racing driver Mike Brannan has a reputation for doing whatever it takes to win. Powerful nationwide columnist Regina Forbes decides to interview Mike just before a race, and becomes annoyed when he is rather brusque with her. At the Newark track, Mike and popular competitor Joe Youghal fight for the lead. When a car they are about to lap crashes in front of them, Mike safely drives around it on the inside, forcing Joe to try to go outside. The result is a three car wreck in which Youghal is killed. In her column the next day, Regina blames Mike for Joe's death and brings up a prior racing fatality involving him. As a result, he is barred by nervous midget racing circuit managers anxious to avoid bad publicity.

Unable to race, Mike has to sell his midget racing car. He becomes a star stunt driver for Joie Chitwood, performing dangerous stunts at auto circuses for $100 a show. When Regina's editor, Gregg, updates her about Mike, she shows unexpected interest. She goes to see how  Mike is doing. He tells her he has earned enough money to buy an Indy car of his own and enter the big leagues, where Regina has no influence. She provokes him into first slapping and then kissing her. She likes it, and they start seeing each other.

He is very successful on the racetrack, always finishing in the money; but the relationship between Mike and Regina is rocky. When a corrupt businessman Regina has been hounding is convicted and commits suicide rather than face 25 years in prison, she sees that she possesses some of the same ruthlessness that makes Mike so successful on the racetrack and better understands him, and begins to love him.

Brannan qualifies for the Indy 500 at the famous Indianapolis Speedway. During the race, at a key moment reminiscent of what happened at Newark with a wreck on the track, Mike waves a competitor through a gap big enough for only one of them. He attempts to go around the wreck on the grass, but his car flips and tumbles. He is rushed to the hospital, luckily with only minor injuries. Regina rushes to the track hospital, lets him know that she is proud of him, and declares her love for him.

Cast
 Clark Gable as Mike Brannan
 Barbara Stanwyck as Regina Forbes
 Adolphe Menjou as Gregg, Regina's editor
 Will Geer as Jack Mackay, race car builder and Brannon's crew chief
 Roland Winters as Dwight Barrington, an unscrupulous businessman and another of Regina's targets
 William C. McGaw as Joie Chitwood
 Lela Bliss as Regina's secretary
 Emory Parnell as Mr. Wendall
 Frank Jenks as Press agent
 Helen Spring as Janie
 Bill Hickman as Mike's pit crew
 Lew Smith as Mike's pit crew
 "Bullet" Joe Garson as Joe Youghal

Production
Because Stanwyck was at the Indianapolis Speedway to film the final scenes for the film she was on hand in Victory Lane after the 1950 race to offer the real 500 winner, Johnny Parsons, the traditional congratulatory kiss.

Reception
According to MGM records, the film earned $2,061,000 in North America and $861,000 elsewhere, resulting in a profit of $47,000.

References

External links

1950 films
1950 romantic drama films
1950s American films
1950s English-language films
American auto racing films
American black-and-white films
American romantic drama films
Films about journalists
Films directed by Clarence Brown
Films scored by Bronisław Kaper
Films shot in Indiana
Metro-Goldwyn-Mayer films